Robert Elphinstone (born 22 November 1960) is a former Australian rules footballer who played with St Kilda in the Victorian Football League (VFL).

A Seaford recruit, Elphinstone had spent his early sporting years as a golfer and only started playing football in his late teens. He was a half-back, equally at home on the flanks or at centre half-back. Elphinstone, who was nicknamed "Eel", had his best season in 1983 when he averaged 19 disposals and polled 11 votes in the Brownlow Medal count, a total not bettered by any teammates. That year he also represented Victoria at State of Origin football. He tried to join Richmond at the end of the 1985 season but was convinced to remain the club when 40 of St Kilda's players and their coach, Graeme Gellie, visited him at his home and asked him to stay.

References

1960 births
Australian rules footballers from Victoria (Australia)
St Kilda Football Club players
Living people
Victorian State of Origin players